We All Get Lucky Sometimes is the fourth studio album by American country music singer Lee Roy Parnell. It was released in 1995 as his first album for Career Records, a sister label of Arista Nashville. This album produced five singles for him on the Billboard country singles charts. "A Little Bit of You" was the first, at #2, followed by "When a Woman Loves a Man" (#12), "Heart's Desire" (#3), "Givin' Water to a Drowning Man" (#12), and the title track (#46). It is also his highest-peaking album on Top Country Albums, peaking at #26 there.

"Squeeze Me In" was covered by Garth Brooks as a duet with Trisha Yearwood on his 2001 album Scarecrow, from which it was released as a single in 2002. The final track, "Catwalk", is an instrumental featuring accordionist Flaco Jiménez.

Track listing

Personnel

The Hot Links
 Kevin McKendree - piano (4, 5, 10)
 Steve Mackey - bass guitar
 Lee Roy Parnell - Dobro, electric guitar, lead guitar, slide guitar, lead vocals (1-10)
 James Pennebaker - fiddle, electric guitar, rhythm guitar, mandolin
 Lynn Williams - drums

Additional musicians
 Trey Bruce - choir (2)
 Mary Chapin Carpenter - background vocals (6)
 Steve Conn - accordion (9)
 Dan Dugmore - steel guitar
 Chris Egan - choir (2)
 Scott Hendricks - choir (2)
 Flaco Jiménez - accordion (11)
 John Kunz - choir (2)
 Jonell Mosser - background vocals (1-3, 5, 7-10)
 Rob Roy Parnell - harmonica (5)
 Mike Reid - electric piano (7)
 John Wesley Ryles - background vocals (1-3, 5, 7-10)
 Michael Spriggs - acoustic guitar (1-10)
 Dennis Wilson - background vocals (1-3, 5, 7-10)
 Reese Wynans - keyboards (11), organ (1-10), piano (1-3, 6-9)
 Trisha Yearwood - background vocals (4)
 Joe Zaukus - choir (2)

Chart performance

References

1995 albums
Arista Records albums
Lee Roy Parnell albums
Albums produced by Scott Hendricks